Billboard magazine each year releases a Year-End chart of the most popular songs across all genres called the Hot 100 songs of the year. This is the year-end Hot 100 songs of 1986.

See also
1986 in music
List of Billboard Hot 100 number-one singles of 1986
List of Billboard Hot 100 top-ten singles in 1986

References

1986 record charts
Billboard charts